The South African cricket team toured India in the 1991–92 season. The tour was significant in that it was South Africa's first official international cricket series since their suspension from the sport in 1970 due to the apartheid policy.

The tour consisted of a series of three One Day International (ODI) matches against the Indian national team and were the first-ever official ODIs played by South Africa. India won the series 2–1, and the Men of the Series were Sanjay Manjrekar of India and Kepler Wessels of South Africa.

Squads

Match details

1st ODI

The first match was South Africa's first-ever ODI and their first cricket match of any sort against India. The attendance was reported to be over 90,000. 

The match was reduced to 47 overs per side. India won the toss and chose to field. South Africa scored 177/8 in their 47 overs with notable contributions from Wessels (50) and Adrian Kuiper (43). In their reply, India started badly with Allan Donald grabbing the first 3 wickets to leave India at 20/3. Sachin Tendulkar (62) and debutant Pravin Amre (55) guided India close to victory and despite Donald dismissing both of them to complete a 5-wicket haul, the lower order finished the game for India to give them a 1–0 lead in the series.

2nd ODI

The second match of the series was reduced to 45 overs per side. South Africa won the toss and inserted India. Half-centuries from Kris Srikkanth (68), Navjot Sidhu (61) and Sanjay Manjrekar (52*) helped India to a total of 223/6. In reply, South Africa could only score 185/8 leaving India with a 2–0 lead in the series. Kepler Wessels again top-scored for South Africa with 71.

3rd ODI

In the third match, India won the toss and Ravi Shastri, the stand-in captain for the absent Mohammad Azharuddin, chose to bat. Shastri (109), Kris Srikkanth (53) and Sanjay Manjrekar (105) again scored the bulk of the runs with India finishing on 287/4. South Africa reached their target with more than 3 overs to spare thanks to half-centuries from Kepler Wessels (90), Peter Kirsten (86*) and Adrian Kuiper (63*). This was South Africa's first-ever ODI victory.

External links
 Cricinfo
 CricketArchive
 Wisden reports

References

1991 in Indian cricket
1991 in South African cricket
1992 in Indian cricket
1992 in South African cricket
Indian cricket seasons from 1970–71 to 1999–2000
International cricket competitions from 1991–92 to 1994
1991-92